The Executive Council of Quebec is the cabinet of the Government of Quebec. It comprises ministers of the provincial Crown, who are selected by the premier of Quebec and appointed by the lieutenant governor.

Composition 
Typically made up of members of the National Assembly of Quebec, the provincial Executive Council is similar in structure and role to the federal Cabinet of Canada. The lieutenant governor, as representative of the Crown in Right of Quebec, heads the council, and is referred to as the Governor-in-Council. Other members of the cabinet are selected by the premier, and appointed by the lieutenant governor. Most members are the head of a ministry, but this is not always the case.

Membership

The current cabinet has been in place since October 18, 2018, after the 2018 election elected the Coalition Avenir Québec under François Legault.

References